Dorsey is a surname. Notable people with the surname include:

Anna Hanson Dorsey (1815–1896), American novelist
Arnold George Dorsey (born 1936), birth name of British-American singer Engelbert Humperdinck
Candas Jane Dorsey (born 1952), Canadian poet and science fiction novelist
Clement Dorsey (1778–1848), American politician
Dana A. Dorsey (1872–1940), American businessman and philanthropist
Dean Dorsey (born 1957), Canadian football player
Decatur Dorsey (1836–1891), American Civil War hero
Ella Loraine Dorsey (1853–1935), American author, journalist, translator
Eric Dorsey (born 1964), American football player
Frank Joseph Gerard Dorsey (1891–1949), American politician and soldier
George Dorsey (disambiguation), multiple people
Glenn Dorsey (born 1985), American football
Hugh Manson Dorsey (1871–1948), American politician
Ida Dorsey (1866–1918), American madam
Issan Dorsey (1933–1990), American zen monk
Jack Dorsey (born 1976), American co-founder and CEO of Twitter and Square, Inc.
James Owen Dorsey (1848–1895), American ethnologist, linguist, and missionary
Jim Dorsey (disambiguation), multiple people
Joey Dorsey (born 1983), American basketball player
John Dorsey (disambiguation), multiple people
Julia Dorsey (1850-1919), African-American suffragist
Julie Dorsey, American computer scientist
Ken Dorsey (born 1981), American football player
Khalil Dorsey (born 1998), American football player
Lee Dorsey (1924–1986), American pop singer
Leon Dorsey (1975–2008), American serial killer
Leon Lee Dorsey (born 1958), American jazz bassist
Mattie Dorsey (dates unknown), American classic female blues singer
Michael Dorsey (disambiguation), multiple people
Mike Dorsey (1930–2014), English-Australian actor
Nicole Dorsey, Canadian director and screenwriter
Norbert Dorsey (1929–2013), American Roman Catholic bishop
Ryan Dorsey (born 1983), American actor
Sarah Dorsey (1829–1879), American author and benefactor of Jefferson Davis
Stephen Wallace Dorsey (1842–1916), American politician
Thomas Dorsey (disambiguation), multiple people
Tim Dorsey (born 1961), American crime novelist
Tommy Dorsey (1905–1956), American jazz trombonist
Troy Dorsey (born 1962), American boxer and kickboxer
Tyler Dorsey (born 1996), Greek–American basketball player in the Israeli Basketball Premier League
Walter Dorsey (1771–1823), justice of the Maryland Court of Appeals
William Dorsey (1813–1878), English-Australian medical practitioner
Yvonne Dorsey-Colomb (born 1952), American politician from Louisiana